Per Henrik Lundström (born 13 December 1983) is a Swedish actor. He was educated at Sankt Eriks gymnasium in Stockholm.

Filmography
2017 - The Last Kingdom (TV series)
2016 - The Inspector and the Sea
2015 - The Bridge (2011 TV series) (series 3)
2013 - The Bridge (2011 TV series) (series 2)
2013 - Studentfesten
2008 - Kärlek 3000
2007 - Darling
2006 - Göta kanal 2 – Kanalkampen
2005 - Kocken
2004 - Håkan Bråkan & Josef
2004 - Graven (TV)
2003 - Sprickorna i muren
2003 - Ondskan
2000 - Tillsammans

References

External links

Living people
Swedish male actors
1983 births